In filtering theory the Kushner equation (after Harold Kushner) is an equation for the conditional probability density of the state of a stochastic non-linear dynamical system, given noisy measurements of the state.  It therefore provides the solution of the nonlinear filtering problem in estimation theory. The equation is sometimes referred to as the Stratonovich–Kushner (or Kushner–Stratonovich) equation.

Overview 

Assume the state of the system evolves according to

and a noisy measurement of the system state is available:

where w, v are independent Wiener processes. Then the conditional probability density p(x, t) of the state at time t is given by the Kushner equation:

The term  is the innovation i.e. the difference between the measurement and its expected value.

Kalman–Bucy filter 

One can simply use the Kushner equation to derive the Kalman–Bucy filter for a linear diffusion process. The Kushner equation will be given by

where  is the mean of the conditional probability at time .

Likewise, the variation of the variance  is given by

The conditional probability is then given at every instant by a normal distribution .

See also 
 Zakai equation

References 

Signal estimation
Nonlinear filters